Nightbringers is the eighth studio album by American melodic death metal band The Black Dahlia Murder. This is the first album to feature Brandon Ellis on lead guitar, replacing Ryan Knight. It was released on October 6, 2017, through Metal Blade Records. Nightbringers became the best-selling direct-to-consumer pre-order in Metal Blade Records' history.

Track listing

Personnel

Musicians
 Trevor Strnad – lead vocals
 Brian Eschbach – rhythm guitar, backing vocals
 Brandon Ellis –  lead guitar, backing vocals
 Max Lavelle – bass
 Alan Cassidy – drums

Additional personnel
 The Black Dahlia Murder – production
 Ryan Williams – recording (drums, rhythm guitar, bass)
 Brandon Ellis - recording (lead guitar)
 Joe Cincotta - recording (vocals)
 Ross Trinkaus - production (intro on "Widowmaker")
 Jacob Hansen – mixing, mastering
 Kristian Wåhlin – artwork
 Kevin Wight – design
 Brian Slagel – executive production

Charts

References

2017 albums
The Black Dahlia Murder (band) albums
Metal Blade Records albums